Count On is a major mathematics education project in the United Kingdom which was announced by education secretary David Blunkett at the end of 2000. It was the follow-on to Maths Year 2000 which was the UK's contribution to UNICEF's World Mathematical Year.

Count On had two main strands:
 The website www.counton.org which won the 2002 BETT prize for best free online learning resource.
 "MathFests", which were maths funfairs held around the country, aimed particularly at those who would not normally come into contact with mathematical ideas.

The MathFests were run largely by MatheMagic and the University of York.

The project has now been handed over to the NCETM.

Popularisation of Mathematics
Count On and Maths Year 2000 were some of the first big Popularisation of Mathematics projects. Others are listed below.

International
 World Mathematical Year 2000 
 Statistics 2013 
 World Maths Day (orig. Australian) - next one is 6 March 2013

Australia
 World Maths Day

India
 National Mathematics Year

Ireland
 Maths Week Ireland

Nigeria
 National Mathematics Year

Spain
 Matematica Vital 
 Paul Boron

United Kingdom
 Maths Year 2000 Scotland
 Maths Cymru (Wales)

United States
 Steven Strogatz's blog

References

Mathematics education in the United Kingdom